I've got your nose is a children's game in which a person pretends to pluck the nose from the face of a baby or toddler.

Description
The first person forms a fist, and puts the knuckles of the index and middle fingers on either side of a child's nose. The fist is then withdrawn from the child's face with the thumb of the 'thief' protruding between the index and middle fingers; the thumb represents the stolen nose. This motion is often accompanied by an exclamation such as, "I've got your nose!"

The child may chase the nose thief to retrieve their nose or may retaliate by stealing the first person's (or someone else's) nose. The 'nose' may then be replaced by pressing the thumb to the child's nose and withdrawing the hand, showing the child that the taker no longer possesses the child's nose.

Characteristics
This game is commonly played between children, as well as between adults (e.g. parents, grandparents, uncles) and their young relatives. Young children to the age of 2 or 3 often find the game amusing. Cognitively, this is because three-year-olds have trouble recognising that a thing may look like one thing yet be another, whereas four-year-olds are twice as likely to have that ability. The game is an example of teaching pro-social lying or playful deception to children.

This game is found mainly in the English-speaking world, but also exists elsewhere. For instance in France, it is known as  [or ]  ('I stole your nose').

See also 
 Fig sign, a hand gesture similar to that used in this game, which may be related

References 

Children's games
Hand games
Nose